Mannheim or Manheim is a surname. Notable people with the surname include:

 Amédée Mannheim (1831–1906), French inventor of the modern slide rule
 Camryn Manheim (born 1961), American actress
Jean Mannheim (1863–1945), German-born American painter and educator
 Karl Mannheim (1893–1947), Hungarian sociologist
 Kjetil Manheim (born 1968), Norwegian musician
 Lucie Mannheim (1899–1976), German actress
 Ralph Manheim (1907–1992), American translator
 Robbie Mannheim or Roland Doe (born c. 1935), a boy who was exorcised in the late 1940s, partial inspiration for The Exorcist novel and film
 Milo Manheim (born 2001), American actor 
Fictional characters include:
 Bruno Mannheim, one of Superman's enemies
 Moxie "Boss" Mannheim, a DC Comics villain

German-language surnames
Jewish surnames
Yiddish-language surnames